Islam Merili (born 27 June 1998) is an Algerian professional footballer who plays as a midfielder for USM Alger in the Algerian Ligue Professionnelle 1.

Career
In 2022, he signed a two-year and a half contract with USM Alger.

References

External links
 

1998 births
Living people
Algerian footballers
Association football midfielders
USM Alger players
ASO Chlef players
People from El Attaf